Faya-Largeau Airport  is an airport serving Faya-Largeau, the largest city in northern Chad. It is located in Chad's Borkou Region.

Since 2013, three French Rafale are parked in Faya-Largeau to protect the Chadian airspace.

Facilities

Incidents 
On 16 February 1976, Douglas C-47A TT-LAG of the Force Aérienne Tchadienne was damaged beyond economic repair in an accident at Faya-Largeau Airport.

References

External links
 
 

Airports in Chad
Borkou Region

ms:Lapangan Terbang Goz-Beida